Ruehleia is a genus of sauropodomorph dinosaur from the Late Triassic period of Germany. The type species is R. bedheimensis, described by Galton in 2001, and is named for the German paleontologist Hugo Rühle von Lilienstern. Discovered in 1952, the holotype consists of one nearly complete skeleton, consisting of cervical (neck), dorsal (back), and caudal (tail) vertebrae; a partial sacrum; a scapulocoracoid; pelvic bones; most of the limb bones; and partially complete manus (hands).

 
The fossils were found in central Germany and date to the Norian stage, around 216 to 208 million years ago.

References 

Sauropodomorphs
Norian life
Late Triassic dinosaurs of Europe
Triassic Germany
Fossils of Germany
Fossil taxa described in 2001
Taxa named by Peter Galton